Mofetta (Italian from Latin mephītis, a pestilential exhalation) is a name applied to a volcanic discharge consisting chiefly of carbon dioxide, often associated with other vapours, representing the final phase of volcanic activity. The Oxford Dictionary of English lists mofetta as an archaic term for the modern word fumarole.

The word is used in the plural as mofette, or, following the French fashion, mofettes.  The volcanic vents yielding the emanations are themselves called mofette.  They are not uncommon in Auvergne and in the Eifel, notably on the shore of the Laacher See; whilst other examples are furnished by the Grotta del Cane, near Pozzuoli, the Valley of Death in Java, the Death Gulch in the Yellowstone Park and the series of mofette in Romania's Harghita and Covasna counties.

Depending on the mineral content of the different vapours, mofette may be used for therapeutic purposes as well.  As carbon dioxide is heavier than the air, patients can use it as dry spa, if certain safety regulations are complied with.  The first known record about mofetta treatment for injuries is from the sixteenth century, by Paracelsus.

See also
Fumarole

References

 

Fumaroles
Volcanic landforms
Volcanic degassing